Andreas (Andrew) Margioris (Greek: Ανδρέας Μαργιωρής) is an internist and endocrinologist , Professor of Clinical Chemistry Emeritus in the University of Crete.

Biography 
Andrew Margioris was born in Alexandria, Egypt from Greek parents. His father was the esoteric philosopher Nikolaos Margioris. Margioris attended the University of Athens Medical School; and finished in 1971. He completed his doctorate thesis at the University of Athens in 1975, where he was also teaching as an assistant at the Department of Biochemistry, School of Medicine. He was enrolled as intern in Internal Medicine in 1976 at the Brooklyn Cumberland Medical Center in Downtown Brooklyn. He continued his Internal Medicine training as junior, senior and chief resident at the Medical Center of the Downstate University of New York. He started residency in Endocrinology at the Mount Sinai Medical Center, City University of New York, from 1980 till 1984. Following that, he was promoted as an instructor in Medicine at the same medical center (1985-1988). In 1985, he was awarded a KO8, Clinical Research award (NIH). Following the untimely death of the Chief of the Department of Endocrinology at the Mount Sinai Medical Center, professor Dorothy T. Krieger, Margioris moved his research base at the NICHD, National Institutes of Health (NIH). He was awarded a senior research grant from the National Research Council in 1988. In 1989, he was unanimously elected as an associate professor and head of the Department of Clinical Chemistry at the Medical School, University of Crete, and few years later he was promoted as a full professor. He was elected as Chief of the Medical Service at the University Hospital of Heraklion, Crete from 2010 to 2011 and interim Chairman of the Board of the same hospital in 2010. He was later elected as Dean of the School of Medicine, University of Crete, from 2011 to 2014. He retired in 2014 and he has since be elected as a professor Emeritus. He was also member of the Standing Committee of the European Medical Research Council (2009-2014) and member of the Greek Health Task Force of the Ministry of Health of Greece from 2011 to 2012. He was Editor in Chief of the scientific journal Hormones,  published by Springer-Nature, from 2010 to 2022. Hormones is the official journal of the Greek Endocrine Society and is on PubMed since 2001.

Research 
Margioris has 170 publications sited in PubMed, and 65 publications in textbooks.

References 

1947 births
Living people
Endocrinologists
Greek endocrinologists
Greek physicians
National and Kapodistrian University of Athens alumni
People from Alexandria